This list of bridges in France lists bridges of particular historical, scenic, architectural or engineering interest. Road and railway bridges, viaducts, aqueducts and footbridges are included.

Historical and architectural interest bridges

Major road and railway bridges 
This table presents the structures with spans greater than 100 meters (non-exhaustive list).

Notes and references 
 Notes

  Mérimée database

 

 Others references

See also 

 List of bridges in Paris
 List of medieval bridges in France
 Transport in France
 Roads in France
 Highways in France
 Rail transport in France
 Geography of France
 :fr:Liste des ponts de France protégés aux monuments historiques  - List of bridges in France protected as historical monuments

External links

Further reading